Ralston Park may refer to:
New Ralston Park, the home ground of Abercorn between 1909 and 1920
Old Ralston Park, the home ground of Abercorn between 1899 and 1909